The Outcast is a 1954 American Western film directed by William Witney and starring John Derek and Joan Evans. It was produced and distributed by Republic Pictures and was made on a slightly higher budget than the many of the second features the company released.

Plot
Jet Cosgrave (John Derek) has been cheated out of his inheritance by his crooked uncle, Maj. Linton Cosgrave (Jim Davis) and outcast from the community. Jet tries to clear his name and win back his father’s ranch by hiring some gunmen. Along the way he falls for Judy Polsen (Joan Evans) and also flirts with his uncle’s  fiancee.

Cast
 John Derek as Jet Cosgrave
 Joan Evans as Judy Polsen
 Jim Davis as Maj. Linton Cosgrave
 Catherine McLeod as Alice Austin
 Ben Cooper as The Kid
 Taylor Holmes as Andrew Devlin
 Nana Bryant as Mrs. Banner
 Slim Pickens as Boone Polsen
 Frank Ferguson as Chad Polsen
 James Millican as Cal Prince
 Bob Steele as Dude Rankin
 Nacho Galindo as Curly
 Harry Carey, Jr. as Bert
 Robert 'Buzz' Henry as Zeke Polsen
 Nicolas Coster as Asa Polsen

References

Bibliography
 Pitts, Michael R. Western Movies: A Guide to 5,105 Feature Films. McFarland, 2012.

External links
 
 
 

1954 films
1954 Western (genre) films
American Western (genre) films
Republic Pictures films
Films directed by William Witney
1950s English-language films
1950s American films